Maha Dwara Nikaya; also spelt Maha Dwaya Nikaya or , is a small monastic order of monks in Myanmar (Burma), primarily in Lower Myanmar. This order is very conservative with respect to Vinaya regulations. It is one of 9 legally sanctioned monastic orders (nikaya) in the country, under the 1990 Law Concerning Sangha Organizations.

Statistics

According to 2016 statistics published by the State Sangha Maha Nayaka Committee, 6,166 monks belonged to this monastic order, representing 1.15% of all monks in the country, making it the third largest order after Thudhamma and Shwegyin Nikaya. With respect to geographic representation, the majority are based in Lower Burma, with a sizable plurality of Mahādvāra monks living in Ayeyarwady Region (40.69%), followed by Yangon Region (20.65%), Bago Region (20.61%), and Mon State (9.97%).

Origins
The founding of Maha Dwara Nikaya was inspired by nikaya reforms in Sri Lanka during the 19th century. This Nikaya was founded in 1855, over disputes with the Thudhamma Nikaya on the constitution of a sīmā ( or thein in Burmese), a formal boundary in which Buddhist religious ceremonies (including ordination of Sangha) occur.

In 1900 and 1918, two other groups, the Anaukchaung Dwara and Mula Dwara respectively, separated from the Maha Dwara Nikaya over leadership disputes.

References

See also
Thudhamma Nikaya
Shwegyin Nikaya
Hngettwin Nikaya
Nikaya
Buddhism in Burma

Theravada Buddhist orders
Schools of Buddhism founded in Myanmar